This list comprises all players who have participated in at least one league match for Bermuda Hogges since the team's first USL season in 2007. Players who were on the roster but never played a first team game are not listed; players who appeared for the team in other competitions (CONCACAF Champions League, etc.) but never actually made an USL appearance are noted at the bottom of the page where appropriate. Only one non-Bermudian player has ever played for Bermuda Hogges - Trinidadian midfielder Marlon Rojas.

A "†" denotes players who only appeared in a single match.

A
  Logan Alexander
  Daniel Andrade
  Stephen Astwood

B
  Jonathan Ball
  Jaylon Bather
  Raymond Beach
  Blenn Bean
  Keishen Bean
  Ralph Bean
  Wayne Bean
  Tahj Bell
  Nigel Burgess
  Tyrell Burgess

C
  Andrew Charlton
  Damico Coddington
  Darius Cox

D
  Seion Darrell
  Devaun DeGraff
  Rakeem Deshields
  Kofi Dill
  Lashun Dill
  George Dyer Jr.

F
  Timothy Figureido

G
  Shaun Goater
  Ajani Gibbons-Richardson

H
  Freddy Hall
  Clevon Hill
  Lloyd Holder
  Shayne Hollis

J
  Jemeiko Jennings
  Keith Jennings
  Daniel Johnson

L
  Keston Lewis
  Roger Lee
  Kyle Lightbourne

M
  Quadir Maynard
  Damon Ming
  Brendon Minors
  Jair Minors

N
  John Barry Nusum

P
  Michael Parsons
  Jared Peniston

R
  Kevin Richards
  Corey Richardson
  Cecoy Robinson
  Marlon Rojas
  Antwan Russell
  Tokia Russell

S
  Jelani Scott
  Omar Shakir
  Earnest Signor Jr.
  Angelo Simmons
  Sean Simmons
  Jamie Smith
  Kwame Steede

T
  Devrae Tankard
  Ernest Trott
  Jabrel Tucker
  Troy Tucker

W
  Marquel Waldron
  Tekeyhi Walker
  Nahki Wells
  Jason Williams
  Robert Wilson

Z
  Aljame Zuill
  Dennis Zuill

Sources

2010 Bermuda Hogges stats
2009 Bermuda Hogges stats
2008 Bermuda Hogges stats
2007 Bermuda Hogges stats

References

Bermuda Hogges
 
Association football player non-biographical articles